Albert Costa won in the final 6–7 (4–7), 6–2, 6–2 against Marc-Kevin Goellner.

Seeds
A champion seed is indicated in bold text while text in italics indicates the round in which that seed was eliminated.

  Albert Costa (champion)
  Félix Mantilla (second round)
  Jason Stoltenberg (semifinals)
  Andriy Medvedev (first round)
  Sergi Bruguera (quarterfinals)
  Greg Rusedski (quarterfinals)
  Juan Albert Viloca (second round)
  Marc-Kevin Goellner (final)

Draw

References
 1996 Bournemouth International Draw

Men's Singles
Singles
Sport in Bournemouth